St. Karen's High School, Patna is a co-educational institution located in Boring road and Gola Road area of Patna, India, established in 1965. The high school is affiliated to the Central Board of Secondary Education, New Delhi. The institution was founded by Mr. Donald Patrick Galstaun and his wife Lesley Barbara Galstaun (Robert née Webb). The school celebrated its Golden Jubilee in 2015. The current principal of the school is Mrs. Seema Singh.

History
St. Karen's High School, Patna was founded in the year 1965 by Mr. Donald Patrick Galstaun and his wife Lesley Barbara Galstaun. The school was started in rented premises in 1965 and grew over time to multiple branches. In 2015, the institution celebrated its Golden Jubilee on completion of 50 years.

The school derives its name from the novel Karen written by Marie Killilea in 1952. St. Karen's High School is a minority Anglo-Indian Christian institution and has been established by The Anglo–Indian Educational Society of St. Karen's, which is a registered body.

Location
The main school campus is located in Gola Road area of Patna. There are other branches of the school across Patna and Danapur area.

Curriculum
The school is affiliated to the Central Board of Secondary Education, New Delhi.

Subjects
 English
 Hindi
 Mathematics
 Sanskrit
 Science (Physics, Chemistry, Biology)
 Value Education/Moral Science
 History, Geography, Civics
 Computer Science/Informatics Practices
 Economics
 Business Studies
 Accounting
 Physical Training
 Painting/Fine Arts/Music

Notable alumni
 Sushant Singh Rajput
 Rati Pandey

References

External links 
 (St. Karen's High School)
 (St. Karen's Secondary School)
 (St. Karen's Primary School)
 (St. Karen's Montessori School)
Official website(St. Karen's Collegiate School)

Schools in Patna
Christian schools in Bihar
High schools and secondary schools in Bihar
Educational institutions established in 1965
1965 establishments in Bihar